Igor Aleksandrovich Kot (born 3 June 1980) is a Russian former professional footballer.

Club career
He made his debut in the Russian Premier League in 2004 for FC Kuban Krasnodar.

References

1980 births
Living people
Russian footballers
Association football goalkeepers
FC Kuban Krasnodar players
FC Sodovik Sterlitamak players
FC Chernomorets Novorossiysk players
FC Ural Yekaterinburg players
FC Arsenal Tula players
FC Mordovia Saransk players
Russian Premier League players
FC Orenburg players
Sportspeople from Krasnodar